Oscaecilia polyzona is a species of amphibian in the family Caeciliidae. It is found in Colombia and possibly Panama. Its natural habitats are subtropical or tropical moist lowland forests, plantations, rural gardens and heavily degraded former forest.

References

Oscaecilia
Amphibians of Colombia
Amphibians described in 1880
Taxonomy articles created by Polbot